Yang Se-chan (born December 8, 1986), is a South Korean comedian and singer. As of April 2017, Yang, along with Jeon So-min, was added as a regular cast member of South Korean variety show Running Man.

Personal life
He is also famous for the nicknames of Dongdukchon Talai brothers, Gangsu, MC Ssep Ssep, and Yang Ax. His group debut "Uwonye" and "Triple Axel" debuted in 2003 as musical actor. Two years later, he made his debut with the album 'Only One' in 2008 as a singer. His older brother, Yang Se-hyung, is also a comedian who was a cast member for Infinite Challenge until March 31, 2018.

Filmography

Television shows

Web shows

Music videos

Discography

Awards and nominations

References

External links 
 Yang Se-chan on HanCinema

1986 births
Living people
South Korean male comedians
People from Dongducheon
South Korean comedians
South Korean television presenters